The domain name .blog is a generic top level domain (gTLD) in the Domain Name System of the Internet. Added in 2016, it is intended to be used for blogs. Anyone can sign up for a dot blog domain name at the regular available prices. People can currently purchase .blog domains at a variety of domain registrars. However, there are some restrictions regarding trademark names.

History 
In late 2013, due to concerns over "name collisions", wherein companies could potentially be using some proposed gTLDs internally for their use, the ICANN halted progression of .blog and 24 other proposed gTLDs pending further review.

In 2015, the rights to the .blog TLD were auctioned off to Automattic in for an estimated sum of US$19 million. The TLD became active on 12 May 2016.

In 2019, it was announced that Automattic will switch its backend registry provider for its .blog from Nominet to CentralNic with the goal to further advance .blog through tools and services available from CentralNic.

References

Top-level domains
Automattic